The North Chahar incident between Japan and China in June 1935, resulted in an agreement that demilitarized Chahar province. 

In June 1935, four Japanese soldiers entered the Changpei District of Chahar province, north of the Great Wall, on a journey to Kalgan and Peiping.  They were detained because they did not have required travel permits from the Chahar Provincial Government.  The soldiers were then taken to the headquarters of the local Chinese Divisional Commander, who asked the general in command of the Chinese 29th Army for instructions. The Army commander ordered their release, allowing them to continue on their journey, but with the warning that appropriate permits must be obtained in future. 

A complaint was made by the Japanese Consul at Kalgan, to General Ching, Deputy Commander of the Chinese 29th Army, that the Chinese Guards had searched the Japanese soldiers, pointed rifles at them, and had detained them some hours at Divisional Headquarters, thus insulting the Japanese Army. Soon after, the Consul passed along the matter to the Kwantung Army saying it was very grave and was beyond his power to resolve.  General Mimami Commander-in-Chief of the Kwantung Army appointed Kenji Doihara to negotiate with General Ching. The resulting negotiations resulted in the Chin-Doihara Agreement.

See also
 Second Sino-Japanese War
Actions in Inner Mongolia (1933-36)

Source
 International Military Tribunal for the Far East, Chapter 5: Japanese Aggression Against China

Second Sino-Japanese War
1935 in Japan
1935 in international relations
June 1935 events
History of Zhangjiakou